National Route 291 is a national highway of Japan connecting Maebashi, Gunma and Kashiwazaki, Niigata in Japan, with a total length of 161.6 km (100.41 mi).

The route consists of the Nakayama Tunnel, a vehicular tunnel, replacing the former Nakayama Tunnel.

Route description
A section of National Route 291 in the town of Minakami in Gunma Prefecture is a musical road.

References

National highways in Japan
Roads in Gunma Prefecture
Roads in Niigata Prefecture
Musical roads in Japan